Mohd Faizol bin Hussien (born May 12, 1986, in Johor) is a Malaysian footballer who plays for Hanelang in Malaysia FAM League as a central midfielder.

On 3 November 2013, he assisted Pahang to defeat Kelantan 1–0 in the Malaysia Cup final which ends Pahang's 21 years drought of the cup. In 2014, he also scored a goal in the FA Cup Semifinal and FA Cup final which helped Pahang win over Felda United.

Honours
 Malaysia Cup: 2
 Winners (2): 2013, 2014
 FA Cup: 1 Man of the match
 Winners (1): 2014

References

External links
 Faizol tekad mahu pikat hati Zainal
 Pahang tampil dengan watak sebenar
 Pahang kekalkan rekod bersih dalam Liga Super, kalahkan NS 2-1
 Lapan pemain Pahang rebut empat kekosongan
 Pahang Rampas Pendahulu
 Juara Bertahan Hambar
 Terengganu Selangor tunjuk taring

1986 births
Malaysian footballers
Malaysia Super League players
Sri Pahang FC players
Living people
People from Johor
Malaysian people of Malay descent
Association football midfielders